Daddy Birori (born 12 December 1986), also known as Etekiama Agiti Tady, is a Rwandan international footballer who plays for Sagrada Esperança, as a striker.

Career
Birori has played club football for Mukura Victory Sports, ATRACO, Kiyovu Sports and AS Vita Club.

He made his senior international debut for Rwanda in 2009, and has appeared in FIFA World Cup qualifying matches.

Controversy

Birori was involved in the 2015 Africa Cup of Nations qualification representing Rwanda. In the first round, he played in two games against Libya, the first leg on 18 May ended in a 0-0 draw and on 31 May in the second leg he scored a hat-trick in a 3-0 victory. The Libyan Football Federation filed a complaint with Confederation of African Football that the player should not be eligible and that he had participated in the 2009 CAF Champions League as a Congolese man. Rwandese Association Football Federation Secretary General Olivier Mulindahabi stated that the player was eligible as he had played within Rwanda for five years and he was a Rwandan passport holder.

In the second round games, Rwanda defeated the Republic of the Congo 4-3 on penalties after a 2-0 loss on 20 July and a 2-0 win in the second leg on 2 August. Rwanda qualified for the group stage (third round) where they were drawn with Nigeria, South Africa and Sudan. The Congolese Football Association also complained about the eligibility of Birori.

On 18 August, CAF announced that they had suspended the player for using two different names and dates of birth. The Rwandan passport Daddy Birori listed the date of birth as 12 December 1986 while the Congolese passport listed the name Etekiama Agil Taddy with a date of birth of 13 December 1990.

In addition, Rwanda were disqualified from the 2015 Africa Cup of Nations qualification competition for attempting to mislead CAF. In a statement CAF said that the "Rwandan Football Federation (FERWAFA) maintained that to their knowledge the player Dady Birori had one identity" yet that "investigations revealed that he was summoned as Etekiama Agiti Tady by FERWAFA to join the national team of Rwanda." CAF also overturned the result of the Rwanda victory over Republic of the Congo on 2 August, as a result Congo took the place of Rwanda in Group A of the third round. Stephen Constantine, the coach of Rwanda remarked that "I am bitterly disappointed with CAFs[sic] decision, the same complaint was made by Libya and it was dismissed so what has changed ![sic]"

On 17 September 2014, Birori was suspended by CAF for two years.

In 2018–19, he signed in for Kabuscorp Sport Clube of Angola.

In 2019-20, he signed in for Sagrada Esperança in the Angolan league, the Girabola.

International goals
Scores and results list Rwanda's goal tally first.

References

1986 births
Living people
Footballers from Kinshasa
Rwandan footballers
Rwanda international footballers
Association football forwards
Rwandan expatriate footballers
Expatriate footballers in the Democratic Republic of the Congo
Rwandan expatriate sportspeople in the Democratic Republic of the Congo
AS Vita Club players
Kabuscorp S.C.P. players
ATRACO F.C. players
21st-century Democratic Republic of the Congo people